The 1st Personnel Command was a command of U.S. Army Europe responsible for personnel management and administration.  1st Personnel Command was in existence from 20 October 1978 until 26 June 2008. The command was granted campaign participation credit for the Global War on Terrorism. 1st Personnel Command was formed to replace the U.S. Army Military Personnel Center, Europe, a staff activity created in 1974. Upon disbandment, the mission of the 1st Personnel Command was taken over by the 21st Theater Sustainment Command.

References

Military units and formations established in 1978
Military units and formations disestablished in 2008